Fretted terrain is a type of surface feature common to certain areas of Mars and was discovered in Mariner 9 images. It lies between two different types of terrain.  The surface of Mars can be divided into two parts: low, young, uncratered plains that cover most of the northern hemisphere, and high-standing, old, heavily cratered areas that cover the southern and a small part of the northern hemisphere. Between these two zones is a region called the Martian dichotomy and parts of it contain fretted terrain.  This terrain contains a complicated mix of cliffs, mesas, buttes, and straight-walled and sinuous canyons. It contains smooth, flat lowlands along with steep cliffs.  The scarps or cliffs are usually 1 to 2 km high.  Channels in the area have wide, flat floors and steep walls.  Fretted terrain shows up in northern Arabia, between latitudes 30°N and 50°N and longitudes 270°W and 360°W, and in Aeolis Mensae, between 10 N and 10 S latitude and 240 W and 210 W longitude.  Two good examples of fretted terrain are Deuteronilus Mensae and Protonilus Mensae.

Fretted terrain in Arabia Terra (Ismenius Lacus quadrangle), seems to transition from narrow straight valleys to isolated mesas.  Most of the mesas are surrounded by forms that have been given a variety of names: circum-mesa aprons, debris aprons, rock glaciers, and lobate debris aprons. At first, they appeared to resemble rock glaciers on Earth. But scientists could not be sure. Even after the Mars Global Surveyor (MGS) Mars Orbiter Camera (MOC) took a variety of pictures of fretted terrain, experts could not tell for sure if material was moving or flowing as it would in an ice-rich deposit (glacier).  Eventually, proof of their true nature was discovered when radar studies with the Mars Reconnaissance Orbiter showed that they contained pure water ice covered with a thin layer of rocks that insulated the ice.

Besides rock-covered glaciers around mesas, the region had many steep-walled valleys with lineations—ridges and grooves—on their floors. The material comprising these valley floors is called lineated valley fill. In some of the best images taken by the Viking Orbiters, some of the valley fill appeared to resemble alpine glaciers on Earth. Given this similarity, some scientists assumed that the lineations on these valley floors might have formed by flow of ice in (and perhaps through) these canyons and valleys.  Today it is generally agreed that glacial flow caused the lineations.

Fretted terrain in Aeolis Mensae is similar to that of Arabia Terra, but it lacks debris aprons and lineated valley fill.  The Medusae Fossae Formation, a friable, layered material that is covered with yardangs surrounds parts of the fretted terrain in Aeolis Mensae.

The origin of fretted plateau material is not completely understood.  It does seem to contain fine-grained material, and it has an almost total lack of boulders.  This material contrasts with most of the Martian surface which is covered with the igneous rock basalt.  Basalt breaks into boulders and eventually into sand. It is thought that when plateau material breaks down, the small-sized particles can be easily carried away by the wind.  Erosion of plateau material seems to be much faster than other materials on Mars.  Research presented in 2018 at a Lunar and Planetary Science Conference in Texas suggested that the erosion that formed fretted terrain was aided  by water moving under the surface.

Glaciers 

Glaciers shaped much of the observable surface in large area of Mars, including fretted terrain.  Much of the area in high latitudes, especially the Ismenius Lacus quadrangle, is believed to still contain enormous amounts of water ice.  The ice was probably deposited as snow during a different climate in the past.  The tilt of Mars changes far more than the Earth's tilt.  At times the tilt changes such that the polar ice caps sublimate and the atmosphere carries the moisture to the mid-latitudes where snow falls and accumulates. The Earth's tilt is stabilized by our rather large moon.  The two moons of Mars are tiny. It would be difficult to take a hike on the fretted terrain because the surface is folded, pitted, and often covered with linear striations.  The striations show the direction of movement.  Much of this rough texture is due to sublimation of buried ice creating pits.  The ice goes directly into a gas (this process is called sublimation) and leaves behind an empty space.  Overlying material then collapses into the void.  Glaciers are not pure ice; they contain dirt and rocks.

Cliffs

Lineated floor deposits

Pits

Glacial features
Around the many mesas and buttes in fretted terrain in Arabia is a feature called lobate debris apron (LDA).  We now believe it often is pure ice with a thin covering of debris. Radar studies have determined that LDAs contain ice; therefore these can be important for future colonists of Mars.

Other examples of fretted terrain

See also

References 

Geology of Mars